Toland is a surname. Notable people with the surname include:

Brook Toland (born 1992), American actress
Christopher Toland (born 1985), American figure skater
George Washington Toland (1796–1869), American politician
Gregg Toland (1904–1948), American cinematographer
Hugh Toland (1806—1880), American surgeon and academic
John Toland (1670–1722), Irish-born rationalist philosopher and freethinker
John Toland (born 1949), Irish mathematician
John Toland (1912–2004), American author and historian
Lee Toland Krieger (born 1983), American film director
Mark Toland (born 1986), American magician
Paddy Toland, Irish kickboxer
Tank Toland (born 1973), American wrestler
Tyler Toland (born 2001), Irish football player